= Razan Malash =

Palestinian journalist, television presenter and correspondent

Razan Malash is a Palestinian journalist, television presenter and correspondent for TV channels in Spain and Portugal. Born in Jerusalem, Razan lived and worked in Palestine, Turkey, and then moved to Madrid, where she obtained her PhD on the use of propaganda in radical groups. She currently collaborates with media channels, feminist and human rights associations.

In January 2019, one of her tweets expressing solidarity with civilians suffering from the war in Yemen, aroused controversy in Saudi Arabia and led to her being banned from appearing on Saudi Sports channels followed by a harassment campaign on social media.
